Ruhgam-e Bala (also Romanized as Rūhgām-e Bālā; also known as Rohgām-e Bālā) is a village in Bahu Kalat Rural District, Dashtiari District, Chabahar County, Sistan and Baluchestan Province, Iran. At the 2006 census, its population was 345, in 71 families.

References 

Populated places in Chabahar County